A list of rivers of Saarland, Germany:

B
Bickenalb
Bist
Blies
Bos

E
Ellbach
Erbach

F
Franzenbach

G
Gailbach
Glan

H
Hetschenbach
Holzbach

I
Ill

K
Köllerbach

L
Lambsbach
Leukbach
Löster

M
Mandelbach
Moselle
Mutterbach

N
Nahe
Nied

O
Oster

P
Prims

R
Rohrbach
Rossel

S
Saar
Schwarzbach

T
Theel
Todbach

W
Wadrill
Würzbach

 
Saarland-related lists
Saar